The Hermosa Festival, also known as Zamboanga La Hermosa Festival, popularly known as Fiesta Pilar, is a month-long festival held each year in the city of Zamboanga, the city center of the Western Mindanao Region (Region 11) in the Philippines. It is one of the oldest festivals in the country and the most awaited event in the region.

The festival is held in honor of the miraculous image of Our Lady of the Pillar (Spanish and Chavacano: Nuestra Señora del Pilar), the patroness of Batangas City which is held in every October 12. It is also the patroness of Zaragoza in Spain, the sister city of Zamboanga in Philippines.

History
The Zamboanga La Hermosa Festival embedded in Zamboanga’s rich history of devotion to the Nuestra Señora del Pilar that is supplemented by rich legends. 

In the Spanish Era, Zamboanga was an integral part of Spanish Colonization. In 1635, the Spaniards built a fort in Zamboanga named Real Fuerza de San Jose in Brgy. Zone IV area to secure them against the attacks of the moro warriors. Spaniards held the city as a seat of government and became the cultural center of the south, and was deeply seated in Hispanic heritage and tradition.

In 1734, The Lady's was brought to the fort as a front piece for the main entrance. The western side of the fort was converted into a shrine for The Lady when the fort was rebuilt in 1860 and the fort was renamed Real Fuerza de Nuestra Señora Virgen del Pilar and some also called the fort as Real Fuerza de Nuestra Señora Virgen del Pilar de Zaragoza because of the same name of the Basilica in Zaragoza, Spain.

The city’s devotion to the Lady of Pilar was legendary, because of the wealth of stories, miracles, and apparitions surrounding the virgin for the past few years in the city as people what believed.

Features
The festival features numerous activities such as the street dance competition where different schools in the city are fighting for the title, from the street to the main event which everyone will show their best talent. Major activities include the Wow Zamboanga showing the different tastes, talents and ideas to shows what your barangay has that others are not; Regatta De Zamboanga were the famous Vintas of Zamboanga are racing to win the title, one of the most awaited event in the festivities; Cosechas De Zamboanga, sports events, musical concerts, agriculture-trade fairs, fashion show, chavacano song festival, Miss Zamboanga and other special events to be held every year.

External links
Hermosa Festival Main Website in Zamboanga City Official Website
Zamboanga Hermosa Festival 2009 Schedule

References

Festivals in the Philippines
Mindanao festivals
Culture of Zamboanga City
Tourist attractions in Zamboanga City